Liezel Huber and Bob Bryan were the defending champions, but they lost to Melanie Oudin and Jack Sock in the second round.

Oudin and Sock went on to win the title, defeating Gisela Dulko and Eduardo Schwank in the final 7–6(7–4), 4–6, [10–8].

Seeds

Draw

Finals

Top half

Bottom half

External links
 Main Draw
2011 US Open – Doubles draws and results at the International Tennis Federation

Mixed Doubles
US Open - Mixed Doubles
US Open - Mixed Doubles
US Open (tennis) by year – Mixed doubles